In Greek mythology, Teucer, also Teucrus, Teucros or Teucris, was the son of King Telamon of Salamis Island and his second wife Hesione, daughter of King Laomedon of Troy. He fought alongside his half-brother, Ajax, in the Trojan War and is the legendary founder of the city of Salamis on Cyprus. Through his mother, Teucer was the nephew of King Priam of Troy and the cousin of Hector and Paris—all of whom he fought against in the Trojan War.

Myths
During the Trojan War, Teucer was mainly a great archer, who loosed his shafts from behind the giant shield of his half-brother Ajax the Great. When Hector was driving the Achaeans back toward their ships, Teucer gave the Argives some success by killing many of the charging Trojans, including Hector's charioteer, Archeptolemus son of Iphitos. However, every time he shot an arrow at Hector, Apollo, the protector of the Trojans, would foil the shot. At one point in his rage at Teucer's success, Hector picked up a huge rock and flung it at him. The rock injured Teucer, so that he retired from the fighting for a certain period of time. He took up a spear to fight in the war after his bow was broken by Zeus. He once again challenged Hector, and narrowly avoided the path of Hector's flying javelin in the ensuing battle. He was also one of the Danaans to enter the Trojan Horse. In total, Teucer slew thirty Trojans during the war; of those Homer mentions Aretaon, Orsilochus, Ormenus, Ophelestes, Daetor, Chromius, Lycophontes, Amopaon, Melanippus, Prothoon and Periphetes, as well as the aforementioned Archeptolemus. He also wounded Glaucus, son of Hippolochus.

After Ajax's suicide, Teucer guarded the body to make sure it was buried, insulting Menelaus and Agamemnon when they tried to stop the burial. Finally Odysseus persuaded Agamemnon to let the burial happen. Because of his half-brother's suicide, Teucer stood trial before his father, where he was found guilty of negligence for not bringing his dead half-brother's body or his arms back with him. He was disowned by his father, wasn't allowed back on Salamis Island, and set out to find a new home. His departing words were introduced in the seventh ode of the first book of the Roman poet Horace's Odes, in which he exhorts his companions "nil desperandum", "do not despair", and announces "cras ingens iterabimus aequor", "tomorrow we shall set out upon the vast ocean". This speech has been given a wider applicability in relation to the theme of voyages of discovery, also found in the Ulysses of Tennyson.

Teucer eventually joined King Belus of Tyre in his campaign against Cyprus, and when the island was seized, Belus handed it over to him in reward for his assistance. Teucer founded the city of Salamis on Cyprus, which he named after his home state. He further married Eune, daughter of Cinyras, king of Cyprus, and had by her a daughter Asteria.

The name Teucer is believed to be related to the name of the West Hittite God Tarku (East Hittite Teshub)—the Indo-European Storm God—a role which explains his relationship to Belus, who is associated with the Carthaginian god Baal Hammon.

Local legends of the city of Pontevedra (Galicia) relate the foundation of this city to Teucer (Teucro), although this seems to be based more on the suspicions that Greek traders might have reached that area in ancient times, hence introducing a number of Greek stories. The city is sometimes poetically called "The City of Teucer" and its inhabitants teucrinos. A number of sporting clubs in the municipality use names related to Teucer.

Notes

References

 Euripides, Euripides II: The Cyclops and Heracles, Iphigenia in Tauris, Helen (The Complete Greek Tragedies) (Vol 4), University Of Chicago Press; 1 edition (April 15, 2002). .

 Gaius Julius Hyginus, Fabulae from The Myths of Hyginus translated and edited by Mary Grant. University of Kansas Publications in Humanistic Studies. Online version at the Topos Text Project.
 Homer, The Iliad with an English Translation by A.T. Murray, Ph.D. in two volumes. Cambridge, MA., Harvard University Press; London, William Heinemann, Ltd. 1924. . Online version at the Perseus Digital Library.
 Homer, Homeri Opera in five volumes. Oxford, Oxford University Press. 1920. . Greek text available at the Perseus Digital Library.
 Quintus Horatius Flaccus, The Odes and Carmen Saeculare of Horace. Edition by John Conington. London. George Bell and Sons. 1882. Online version at the Perseus Digital Library.
 Quintus Horatius Flaccus, Odes and Epodes. Edition by Paul Shorey and Gordon J. Laing. Chicago. Benj. H. Sanborn & Co. 1919. Latin text available at the Perseus Digital Library.
 Sophocles, The Ajax of Sophocles edited with introduction and notes by Sir Richard Jebb. Cambridge. Cambridge University Press. 1893. Online version at the Perseus Digital Library.
 Sophocles, Sophocles. Vol 2: Ajax. Electra. Trachiniae. Philoctetes with an English translation by F. Storr. The Loeb classical library, 21. Francis Storr. London; New York. William Heinemann Ltd.; The Macmillan Company. 1913. Greek text available at the Perseus Digital Library.

External links

Achaean Leaders
Mythological Greek archers
Mythological city founders
Kings in Greek mythology
People of the Trojan War
Salaminian characters in Greek mythology
Cypriot mythology